Adeloidea is a superfamily of primitive monotrysian moths in the order Lepidoptera which consists of leafcutters, yucca moths and relatives. This superfamily is characterised by a piercing, extensible ovipositor used for laying eggs in plants (Davis, 1999). Many species are day-flying with metallic patterns.

References

Davis, D.R. (1999). The Monotrysian Heteroneura. Ch. 6, pp. 65–90 in Kristensen, N.P. (Ed.). Lepidoptera, Moths and Butterflies. Volume 1: Evolution, Systematics, and Biogeography. Handbuch der Zoologie. Eine Naturgeschichte der Stämme des Tierreiches / Handbook of Zoology. A Natural History of the phyla of the Animal Kingdom. Band / Volume IV Arthropoda: Insecta Teilband / Part 35: 491 pp. Walter de Gruyter, Berlin, New York.

Sources
Firefly Encyclopedia of Insects and Spiders, edited by Christopher O'Toole, 2002

 
Lepidoptera superfamilies